Leszek Konieczny (August 9, 1933- ) - Polish biochemist, professor (since 1995) at the Jagiellonian University Medical College.

Leszek Konieczny is the author of numerous scientific papers in the field of protein structure and function and immunochemistry. His works include:

References 

1933 births
Academic staff of Jagiellonian University
Polish biochemists
Living people